Peñerúes is one of seven parishes (administrative divisions) in Morcín, a municipality within the province and autonomous community of Asturias, in northern Spain.

Villages
 L'Artusu
 Barrea
 La Roza
 Campo
 La Cotina
 La Gantal
 El Palacio
 Requexo

 Small population entities
 El Caleyón
 La Casona
 La Escalera
 El Fontán
 El Navalón
 El Recuestru
 La Roza
 Treslafonte

References

Parishes in Morcin